The Taquara Municipal Nature Park is a municipal nature park in the state of Rio de Janeiro, Brazil. It protects an area of Atlantic Forest.

Location

The Taquara Municipal Nature Park is in the municipality of Duque de Caxias, Rio de Janeiro
It is at the foot of the Serra de Petrópolis.
It is in the Serra dos Órgãos between the Petrópolis Environmental Protection Area and the Tinguá Biological Reserve.
There is good infrastructure for visitors, including trails that lead past the Taquara River and the Cachoeira das Dores (Waterfall of Sorrows).

The park contains a remnant of Atlantic Forest.
The golden lion tamarin was sighted by experts in 2006, several years after it had been declared extinct in the region.
The park is home to birds including Brazilian tanager (Ramphocelus bresilius), true thrush (Turdus species) and blue-gray tanager (Thraupis episcopus), and mammals such as coati, sloth, armadillo and many apes.

Visitors

The park supports the Guarda Florestal Mirim program, which gives environmental education to children.
The park is visited by up to 4,000 people monthly, especially in summer.
Of the visitors, 54% only had primary education, which may affect receptiveness to typical environmental education programs.
Most of the visitors are young people, 81% male, from Taquara and its neighborhoods.
The most common reason for visiting is to swim in the river or the waterfall.

History

The Taquara Municipal Nature Park was created by municipal law 1157 of 11 December 1992 to  preserve the natural beauty of Caxias.
The park was included in the Central Rio de Janeiro Atlantic Forest Mosaic, created in December 2006.

Notes

Sources

Municipal nature parks of Brazil
Protected areas of Rio de Janeiro (state)
1992 establishments in Brazil